Almost Friends may refer to:

Almost Friends (2014 film), a 2014 French film
Almost Friends (2016 film), a 2016 American film